Cook Inlet is an inlet in Alaska.

Cook Inlet may also refer to:
 Cook Inlet Region, Inc., an Alaska Native regional corporation
 , a United States Navy seaplane tender in commission from 1944 to 1946
 , later WHEC-384, a United States Coast Guard cutter in commission from 1949 to 1971
 Cook Inlet beluga whale, a type of Beluga (whale)
 The Cook Inlet Basin

See also
 Knik Arm ferry or Cook Inlet ferry, a proposed year-round passenger and auto ferry across Knik Arm between Anchorage and Point MacKenzie in Alaska